Harry Baldwin (17 July 1920 – 28 October 2010) was an English professional footballer who made more than 200 Football League appearances playing as a goalkeeper for West Bromwich Albion, Brighton & Hove Albion and Walsall.

Life and career
Baldwin was born in Saltley, Birmingham. He joined West Bromwich Albion from Sutton Town as a 15-year-old amateur in 1936, and made his first-team debut at 17 in 1938 in a 4–3 win in the First Division against local rivals Birmingham. He kept his place for the remaining four matches of the season, but was unable to help West Brom retain their top-flight status. He turned professional, but broke his collarbone, never regained his place, and was released at the end of the season. He moved on to Brighton & Hove Albion, but played just one league match before competitive football was abandoned for the duration of the Second World War.

He served in the Royal Navy during the war but was medically discharged. After recovering, he made guest appearances in the wartime competitions for clubs including Nottingham Forest and Northampton Town, and then returned to Brighton & Hove Albion. For the next seven seasons, Baldwin shared the goalkeeper position with Jack Ball, and took his appearance total to 183 in first-team competitions. Despite his lack of heighthe stood he was particularly adept at saving penalties: in the 1947–48 season he saved seven penalties out of nine faced, including five in succession.

Baldwin moved on in 1952 to an engineering job in Northampton, continuing his football career with Kettering Town of the Southern League, but returned to the Football League in 1953 with Walsall. After 18 months and 37 appearances, he moved to Wellington Town where injury ended his career. He returned to engineering, and ran machine-tool companies in the Midlands.

Baldwin died in Northampton in 2010 at the age of 90.

References

1920 births
2010 deaths
Footballers from Birmingham, West Midlands
English footballers
Association football goalkeepers
Sutton Coldfield Town F.C. players
West Bromwich Albion F.C. players
Brighton & Hove Albion F.C. players
Kettering Town F.C. players
Walsall F.C. players
Telford United F.C. players
English Football League players
Southern Football League players
Royal Navy personnel of World War II